Ramdhuni is a municipality located in the Sunsari district, Koshi province of Eastern Nepal. It was established in 2014.  Ramdhuni  previously known as Jhumka Bazar. It is approximately 356km far from Kathmandu.  This town lies in the middle of two famous cities Itahari and Inaruwa. Mahendra highway passes right through the heart of the town. Chatara Canal (Sunsari Morang Irrigation Project) originates all the way from Koshi River and flows through the town from north to south. This canal plays an important role in the agriculture of Sunsari and Morang district. Ramdhuni has a total area of 48.10 square kilometers. It has a population of 28,549 of which 13,211 are males and 15,388 are females living in 6347 individual houses.

Geography
Geographically, Ramdhuni is in the Terai region of Nepal. Its elevation is approximately 185m from the sea level. This means most of the part of town lies in a proper plain land. Chatara canal provides water to the irrigation system of the town and surrounding places.

Transportation
It is well connected by roads to the major cities of Nepal including the capital Kathmandu. The nearest airport is Biratnagar Airport which is approximately 30km from the town of Ramdhuni. Dharan, Itahari, Inaruwa and Biratnagar are some the nearest cities to Ramdhuni. Regular bus service is organized from Dharan, Biratnagar via Ramdhuni to the other major cities of Nepal.

Tourism
It is the gateway to some of the historical places of Sunsari District.
It provides the easiest access to the devotees traveling to Chatara(also known as Parchin Haridwar), Barahkshetra Mandir(Baraha Temple), and Ramdhuni Mandir.

References 

Populated places in Sunsari District
Government of Nepal
Municipalities in Koshi Province
Nepal municipalities established in 2014
Municipalities in Sunsari District